Mahmadali Sodikov (born 20 March 1984) is a Tajikistani footballer who plays as a forward for CSKA Pamir Dushanbe and the Tajikistan national football team.

Career statistics

Club

International

Statistics accurate as of match played 21 March 2013

Honors
Khujand
 Tajik Cup (1): 2008

Istiklol
 Tajik League (1): 2011
AFC President's Cup (1): 2012

References

External links

1984 births
Living people
Tajikistani footballers
Vakhsh Qurghonteppa players
Association football forwards
Tajikistan Higher League players
Tajikistan international footballers